Michael Luk Chung-hung (born 21 September 1978) is a Hong Kong politician. He is a member of the Hong Kong Federation of Trade Unions (HKFTU) and the Democratic Alliance for the Betterment and Progress of Hong Kong (DAB). He is also member of the Yuen Long District Council since 2003 for Tin Heng and member of the Legislative Council of Hong Kong for Labour functional constituency elected in the 2016 Hong Kong Legislative Council election.  He lost his district council seat in 2019 following a rout of pro-Beijing candidates amidst the 2019–20 Hong Kong protests.

In March 2021, Luk claimed that the BBC "specializes in doing fake news to smear China and Hong Kong for its political goals."

In March 2021, Luk announced support for cotton from Xinjiang in mainland China, after some companies had expressed concerns about human rights abuses, and said products from mainland China are also of quality.

In January 2022, Luk urged the public to stop focusing on an event where many government officials attended a large birthday party for Witman Hung Wai-man, and to instead focus on alleged mistakes by Cathay Pacific crew instead.

References

1978 births
Living people
Hong Kong trade unionists
Hong Kong Federation of Trade Unions
Democratic Alliance for the Betterment and Progress of Hong Kong politicians
District councillors of Yuen Long District
HK LegCo Members 2016–2021
Members of the Election Committee of Hong Kong, 2021–2026
Hong Kong pro-Beijing politicians